Phasa Willk'i (Aymara phasa edible earth, willk'i gap, "phasa gap", also spelled Pasa Willkhi, Phasa Willkhi) is a  mountain in a volcanic complex in the Cordillera Occidental in the Andes of Bolivia. It is situated in the Oruro Department, Sajama Province, Turco Municipality. Phasa Willk'i lies southwest of Asu Asuni and Turi Turini. The Jaruma River originates east of the mountain. It flows to the south.

References 

Mountains of Oruro Department